Antebellum is a 2020 American thriller film written and directed by Gerard Bush and Christopher Renz in their feature directorial debuts. The film stars Janelle Monáe, Eric Lange, Jena Malone, Jack Huston, Kiersey Clemons, and Gabourey Sidibe, and follows a 21st century African-American woman who wakes to find herself mysteriously in a Southern slave plantation from which she must escape.

Antebellum was released in the United States through premium video on demand on September 18, 2020, and theatrically in several other countries. The film received mixed reviews from critics, who criticized the screenplay and felt that the film failed to live up to its full potential.

Plot 
In a Louisiana slave plantation run by Confederate soldiers, slaves are treated harshly and not allowed to speak unless spoken to. Those who attempt to escape are killed and their bodies burned in a crematorium. After a failed escape attempt, a black man named Eli watches as his wife is murdered and her body placed in the crematorium. A woman who had been assisting them is later brutally beaten and branded by the general until she submits to being called Eden.

A group of new slaves is brought to the plantation. Among them is a pregnant woman whom the general's daughter Elizabeth names Julia and places in the care of Eden. Julia asks Eden to plan an escape while Eden urges her to keep her head down. That evening during a dinner where Julia and Eden are forced to wait on soldiers in the army, a shy Confederate soldier named Daniel is attracted to Julia and arranges to go to her cabin later. When Julia tries to play on his kindness and asks him to help her, he gets angry and tells her that he is still a Confederate. He beats her for speaking when not spoken to, causing her to miscarry.

After being raped by the general in her cabin, Eden hears a ringing cell phone. In the modern era, a cell phone rings, awakening Eden, who is a renowned sociologist named Dr. Veronica Henley. She is preparing to take a trip to speak and promote her book, which is particularly hard for her because she has to leave her husband Nick and her daughter Kennedi. She has a bizarre online meeting with Elizabeth which leaves her uncomfortable, but she dismisses her feelings and cuts the meeting short.

While in Louisiana on her book tour, she meets acquaintances Dawn and Sarah and agrees to go to dinner with them at a local restaurant. In the meantime, Elizabeth sneaks into her hotel room and steals her lipstick. Intending to go back home early in the morning, Veronica leaves the restaurant in what she believes is her Uber ride but is a car driven by Elizabeth. Elizabeth's husband Jasper knocks Veronica out.

At the plantation, Veronica discovers that Julia has hanged herself. Enraged, she tells Eli that they will escape that night. After being raped by the general again the following evening, she once again sneaks out of her cabin and steals the general's phone. Before she can call for help, she is interrupted by an intoxicated Daniel and another soldier who find the phone but are not suspicious believing it dropped out of the general's bag.

When he is alone, Eli kills Daniel with a hatchet and retrieves the cell phone. As the phone can only be unlocked with facial recognition, Veronica goes back to the cabin to find the general and is surprised to find he is awake. The general attacks both of them and Eli is subsequently killed trying to protect Veronica. She stabs the general with his own bayonet and unlocks the phone, then uses GPS to send her location to her husband. Intending to hide the general in the crematorium, she is interrupted by Jasper. Veronica lures him and another soldier into the crematorium and sets fire to it, leaving the three men to burn to death as she steals the general's horse and rides off.

Elizabeth and another soldier pursue Veronica on horseback and reveals that she handpicked every slave on the plantation except for Veronica, whom she kidnapped at her father's insistence. Veronica knocks Elizabeth off her horse and puts a rope around her neck, dragging her until she hits the base of a Robert E. Lee statue, thereby breaking her neck.

Veronica flees the pursuing soldiers into the chaos of a battle, revealing that the so-called plantation is part of a Civil War reenactment park called Antebellum, owned by Senator Blake Denton, who is posing as the general. Denton and his comrades intended to use the park to recreate an environment to reinstitute the practice of chattel slavery using African-American victims. Veronica finally escapes as the police arrive and the park is later shut down by the FBI.

Cast

Production 
In March 2019, it was announced Janelle Monáe had joined the cast of the film, with Gerard Bush and Christopher Renz directing from a screenplay they wrote. Ray Mansfield and Sean McKittrick serve as producers on the film under their QC Entertainment banner, and Lionsgate are distributors. In April 2019, Eric Lange, Jena Malone, Jack Huston, Kiersey Clemons, Tongayi Chirisa, Gabourey Sidibe, Robert Aramayo and Lily Cowles joined the cast of the film.
In May 2019, Marque Richardson joined the cast of the film.

Principal photography began in May 2019 around New Orleans, Louisiana.

Release 
Antebellum was released through video on demand in the United States on September 18, 2020, while still playing in theaters in select countries. This includes a theatrical release in Australia on October 1, 2020. The film was originally scheduled to be released on April 24, 2020, but was pulled off the schedule due to the COVID-19 pandemic, then was rescheduled to August 21, 2020, before being pulled off the release schedule again in July 2020.

Reception

VOD rentals 
In its debut weekend, Antebellum was the number one most rented title across film and television on Amazon Prime Video, and number one rented film on FandangoNow and Apple TV, and third on Google Play. IndieWire estimated that if about 500,000 homes rented the film, it would result in $8 million for the studio. In its second weekend the film topped the Amazon Prime Video, FandangoNow and Spectrum film charts, while finishing second at Google Play and sixth at Apple TV, and remained in the top three across most platforms in its third weekend. In October 2020, The Hollywood Reporter said the film was the sixth-most popular PVOD title amid the COVID-19 pandemic.

Critical response 
On review aggregator Rotten Tomatoes, the film holds an approval rating of 30% based on 205 reviews, with an average rating of 4.8/10. The website's critical consensus reads: "Antebellum fails to connect its images with any meaning, making for a largely unpleasant experience lacking any substantial scares." On Metacritic, the film has a weighted average score of 43 out of 100 based on 40 reviews, indicating "mixed or average reviews".

Peter Debruge from Variety called it "A mind blowing thriller". Stephanie Zacharek of Time wrote "Even if we didn't live in a country where a shockingly large fraction of people think Confederate monuments are A-O.K., Gerard Bush and Christopher Renz's Antebellum would resonate like the boom of a Union Army cannon". David Ehrlich of IndieWire gave the film a "C+" and wrote, "An artful and provocative movie about the enduring horror of America's original sin, Antebellum can't follow through on its own concept." Writing for The Hollywood Reporter, Jourdain Searles said the film was "more interested in making a point than digging deep" and "In the end, Antebellum is undone by a lack of empathy and emotion. It has no real perspective on the past and thus fails to make any real impact on the present."

Accolades 
Peter Debruge included the film on his list of "best films of 2020" for Variety, praising its cinematic quality, effective storytelling and social relevancy.

References

External links 
 
 
 

2020 films
2020 horror thriller films
African-American horror films
African-American films
American horror thriller films
Films about American slavery
Films about racism in the United States
Films postponed due to the COVID-19 pandemic
Films set on farms
Films set in Louisiana
Films shot in New Orleans
Lionsgate films
2020s English-language films
2020s American films
2020 directorial debut films